A naming taboo is a cultural taboo against speaking or writing the given names of exalted persons, notably in China and within the Chinese cultural sphere. It was enforced by several laws throughout Imperial China, but its cultural and possibly religious origins predate the Qin dynasty. Not respecting the appropriate naming taboos was considered a sign of lacking education and respect, and brought shame both to the offender and the offended person.

Types
 The naming taboo of the state ( guóhuì) discouraged the use of the emperor's given name and those of his ancestors. For example, during the Qin Dynasty, Qin Shi Huang's given name  Zhèng (<  B-S: *teŋ-s) was avoided, and the first month of the year, the upright month (Zhèngyuè) had its pronunciation modified to Zhēngyuè (OC B-S: *teŋ, like  "to go on a long journey, to go on a military campaign") and then further renamed as the proper/upright month (Duānyuè < OC, B-S *tˤor]). The strength of this taboo was reinforced by law; transgressors could expect serious punishment for writing an emperor's name without modifications. In 1777, Wang Xihou, in his dictionary, criticized the Kangxi dictionary and wrote the Qianlong Emperor's name without leaving out any stroke as required. This disrespect resulted in his and his family's executions and confiscation of their property. This type of naming taboo is no longer observed in modern China.
 The naming taboo of the clan discouraged the use of the names of one's own ancestors. Generally, ancestor names going back to seven generations were avoided. In diplomatic documents and letters between clans, each clan's naming taboos were observed.
 The naming taboo of the holinesses discouraged the use of the names of respected people. For example, writing the name of Confucius was taboo during the Jin Dynasty.

Methods to avoid offense

There were three ways to avoid using a taboo character:
 Changing the character to another, usually a synonym or one which sounded similar to the character being avoided. For example, the Black Warrior Gate (Xuanwu Gate) of the Forbidden City was renamed the Gate of Divine Might (神武門; Shenwu Gate) in order to avoid using a character from the Kangxi Emperor's name, Xuanye.
 Leaving the character as a blank.
 Omitting a stroke in the character, usually the final stroke.

In history
Throughout Chinese history, there were emperors whose names contained common characters who would try to alleviate the burden of the populace in practicing name avoidance. For example, Emperor Xuan of Han, whose given name Bingyi (病已) contained two very common characters, changed his name to Xun (詢), a far less common character, with the stated purpose of making it easier for his people to avoid using his name. Similarly, Emperor Taizong of Tang, whose given name Shimin (世民) also contained two very common characters, ordered that name avoidance only required the avoidance of the characters Shi and Min in direct succession and that it did not require the avoidance of those characters in isolation.

However, Emperor Taizong's son Emperor Gaozong of Tang effectively made this edict ineffective after his death, by requiring the complete avoidance of the characters Shi and Min, necessitating the chancellor Li Shiji to change his name to Li Ji. In later dynasties, princes were frequently given names that contained uncommon characters to make it easier for the public to avoid them, should they become emperor later in life.

During the rule of the Ming Emperor of Han (Liu Zhuang), whose personal name was Zhuang, most people with surname Zhuang (莊) were ordered to change their names to its synonym Yan. 

The custom of naming taboo had a built-in contradiction: without knowing what the emperors' names were, one could hardly be expected to avoid them, thus somehow the emperors' names had to be informally transmitted to the populace to allow them to take cognizance of and thus avoid using said characters. In one famous incident in 435, during the Northern Wei Dynasty, Goguryeo ambassadors made a formal request that the imperial government issue them a document containing the emperors' names so that they could avoid offending the emperor while submitting their king's petition. Emperor Taiwu of Northern Wei agreed and issued them such a document. However, the mechanism of how the regular populace would be able to learn the emperors' names remained generally unclear throughout Chinese history.

This taboo is important to keep in mind when studying ancient historical texts from the cultural sphere, as historical characters and/or locations may be renamed if they happen to share a name with the emperor in power (or previous emperors of the same dynasty) when the text was written. Thus, the study of naming taboos can also help date an ancient text.

In other countries 
Japan was also influenced by the naming taboo. In modern Japan, it concerns only the successive Emperors. For example, whether oral or written, people only refer to the reigning Emperor as Tennō Heika (his Majesty the Emperor) or Kinjō Heika (his current Majesty).
See also Posthumous name.
Historically, it was considered very rude among upper class to call someone else's real name, even if it was the lord calling his vassals. Calling someone else's real name was equivalent to picking a fight. Titles or pseudonyms were often used when calling others in place of their real names.

In Vietnam, the family name Hoàng (黃) was changed to Huỳnh in the South due to the naming taboo of Lord Nguyễn Hoàng's name. Similarly, the family name "Vũ" (武) is known as "Võ" in the South.

See also 
 Imperial examination in Chinese mythology, example
 Names of God in Judaism, similar taboo
 Taboo against naming the dead, similar taboo in many cultures

References

Further reading 
陳垣 [Chen Yuan],《史諱舉例》 [Examples of Taboos in History] - the pioneering work in the field, written during the early 20th century, numerous editions

Chinese culture
Naming
Taboo
East Asian traditions